Engineers is the debut studio album of the British shoegaze band Engineers, released on 7 March 2005 by the Echo Label. Engineers was supported by the release of two singles, "Forgiveness" in February 2005 and "Home" in June 2005. The album was preceded by the mini-album Folly on 27 September 2004, which includes the album version of "Come in Out of the Rain" and the original mix of "Forgiveness". 

The album was released to generally positive reviews; at Metacritic, which assigns a normalised rating out of 100 reviews from mainstream critics, the album has received a generally favourable score of 81, based on 18 reviews.

In 2010, the song "Home" became the theme song for the HBO TV series Big Love.

Artwork
The artwork for releases by Engineers during this period feature paintings by British artist David Thorpe (through the Maureen Paley gallery):

 Folly EP
 front cover: Do What You Have to Do, 1998
 Engineers album
 front cover: Pilgrims, 1999
 booklet: Untitled (Skyline), 1999
 "Forgiveness" single
 front cover: Out from the Night, the Day Is Beautiful and We are Filled with Joy, 1999

Track listing

Singles
 "Forgiveness" (21 February 2005)
 CD (ECSCD159)
 "Forgiveness"
 "Stake to Glory"
 "Cats of Justice"
 7" vinyl (ECS159)
 "Forgiveness"
 "Cats of Justice"
 "Home" (13 June 2005)
 Netherlands CD EP (113.0166.179)
 "Home"
 "Home" (Jagz Kooner Funhouse Remix)
 "Home" (Mogwai Wazzap Remix)
 "Home" (U-MYX enhanced section)
 "Home" (enhanced video)
Released as a digital download only in the UK. Originally planned for 7" (ECS166) and CD (ECSCD166); was released in the Netherlands by Play It Again Sam.

Credits
 All songs produced by Engineers, except:
 "Home" produced by Engineers, with additional production by Kevin Bacon and Jonathan Quarmby for Manna Productions.
 "Forgiveness" produced by Kevin Bacon and Jonathan Quarmby, with additional production by Engineers.
 "Waved On" produced by Engineers and Tim Holmes.
 "Peter Street" produced by Mark Peters

 All tracks mixed by David Bascombe, except:
 "Home" and "Forgiveness" mixed by Kevin Bacon and Jonathan Quarmby.
 "New Horizons" and "Thrasher" mixed by Dan MacBean and Mark Peters
 "Peter Street" mixed by Mark Peters
 Art direction and design by Simon Earith for Blue Source; original artwork by David Thorpe.

References

2005 debut albums
Engineers (band) albums
The Echo Label albums